During the 1996–97 English football season, AFC Bournemouth competed in the Football League Second Division.

Season summary
In the 1996–97 season, Bournemouth had another satisfying campaign, this time finishing in 16th place. Their financial problems off the pitch continued with Ken Gardiner resigning as chairman in December and Brian Willis took over as acting chairman until the summer. In January 1997, Bournemouth were £4.4m in debt and started a petition to raise £300,000 to see the whole season through. Bournemouth also owe £2.1m to Lloyds Bank and another £450,000 was also owed in VAT and PAYE that wasn't paid. As a result of this, 12 members of coaching staff were sacked which also included their assistant manager John Williams.

Final league table

Results
Bournemouth's score comes first

Legend

Football League Second Division

FA Cup

League Cup

Football League Trophy

Squad

References

AFC Bournemouth seasons
AFC Bournemouth